Theodor Dalenson, born 1959, is a Swedish venture capital investor, entrepreneur and art collector.

Biography 

Theodor Dalenson studied law and philosophy at Stockholm University.

Business career 

Theodor has been involved in a number of public companies listed on the Nasdaq OMX stock exchange.

He started his business career as an advisor and associate of Frontiers International in 1983, and is still involved with the firm after 35 years. After a period of advising corporations on strategic planning both in the U.S. through William Kent International and through Mellanfonden, the government fund in Sweden, Theodor started AB Novestra in 1997, an investment firm which became a public company in 2000 on Stockholm stock exchange with Theodor Dalenson as chairman of the board. Novestra was an investor in E-trade Nordic, Framfab, Bredbandsbolaget and QBranch among other first wave internet companies in the Nordics.

Through Nove Capital Management he helped restructure and sell public Swedish companies such as Klippan AB, Pergo AB, Scribona AB and Carl Lamm AB. He served as chairman of most of the entities he was involved in. Since 2016 he has focused his private investment company Novecap Partners and has also remained largest shareholder and chairman of The Shirt Factory AB.

Art Involvement 

Together with his wife Isabella Dalenson, Theodor has since 1993 and through Carling Dalenson AB and Art 4 Aid been involved in the art world as substantial benefactor of institutions such as Moderna Museet in Stockholm, Guggenheim Museum and Foundation, and Aspen Art Museum. He has served as a board member in Guggenheim Foundation (New York), Aspen Art Museum and Americans for the Arts (Washington). In addition, significant donations of art and exhibition contributions have also been made to Whitney Museum, Aspen Art Museum, PAMM Miami and Parrish Art Museum in Water Mill, Long Island. Today, the involvement with art and art institutions remains a significant part of the activities. In addition to this, significant donations have been made to aid organizations such as UNICEF and Human Rights Watch.

Conservation Involvement 

Since 1984, Dalenson has helped reorganising and protecting the Atlantic Salmon fisheries in general and especially on the Alta river in Norway during after the hydro dam construction in Sautso. After being one of the head witnesses in the compensation matters against Statskraft, the hydro company on the Alta river, he spent the rest of the 1990s directing Alta towards the introduction of conservation efforts and catch limits as well as catch and release in all parts of the river. He later helped syndicate the sport fishing on the Alta river and worked as an advisor to three chairmen of the ALI, Osvad Möllers, Lyon Holten and Ivar Leinan to help establish Alta as the foremost Atlantic salmon sport fishery in the world. He is the co-author of three books on the history of sport fishing on the Alta river.

In 1993 his contributions helped start the first collection of historical artefacts at the Alta Museum (a UNESCO World Heritage Site). Theodor was elected to the board of Atlantic Salmon Federation (US) and co-founded the North Atlantic Fund together with Orri Vigfusson in 1992.

External links
  Carling Dalenson
  Novestra
  Guggenheim
  Fokus
  Alta River

References 

1959 births
Living people
Swedish businesspeople
Venture capitalists